This is a list of flag bearers who have represented Puerto Rico at the Olympics.

Flag bearers carry the national flag of their country at the opening ceremony of the Olympic Games.

See also
Puerto Rico at the Olympics

References

Puerto Rico at the Olympics
Puerto Rico
Olympic flagbearers